Boudierella is a genus of fungi in the family Pyronemataceae.

The genus name of Boudierella is in honour of Jean Louis Émile Boudier (1828–1920), was a pharmacist who lived in Montmorency, France.

It was circumscribed in Bull. Soc. Mycol. France Vol.13 on pages 2, 11, 39 in 1897.

References

External links
Index Fungorum

Pyronemataceae
Pezizales genera